Chocolats+Croisier (1815-1950) was a  Swiss manufacturer of luxury chocolates.  At one time, it was the oldest manufacturer of these products in Switzerland.

History 
Charles Henri Daniel Croisier founded the chocolate factory in 1815 in Geneva under the name "Croisier-Chaulmontet".  Croisier's motto was to produce only the best chocolate. 

The production of chocolate was arduous work in 1815: a chocolatier could only produce only 5–6 kg of chocolate per day. In 1844, Crozier's son took over management of Croisier-Chaulmontet. In 1850, the company began mechanizing its production. By 1884, Croisier-Chaulmontet had ordered two water wheels that were driven by the River Rhone to power its production. 

In 1927, the company opened a chocolate powders plant in Lausanne.  That same year, the company was incorporated as Charles Croisier SA. 

In 1950, Chocolats+Croisier closed due to poor economic conditions worldwide.

Literature 

 Schweizerisches Finanz-Jahrbuch, p. 75, 1907
 C. Heymann, Cartell-Rundschau, Volume 5, p. 183, 1907
 Directory of Swiss Manufacturers and Producers,  Schweizerische Zentrale für Handelsförderung, Schweizerisches Nachweisbureau für Bezug und Absatz von Waren, Swiss Office for  the Development of Trade.,  p. 29-30, 1945
 La semaine judiciaire paraissant à Genève: jurisprudence suisse et étrangère, Louis Vaucher, Gustave Fick, Jean Henry Patry, Société genevoise de droit et de législation, Société général d'imprimerie, p. 221, 1919
 Le Grand siècle de l'architecture genevoise, 1800-1914: un guide en douze promenades, Charles Weber, Gérard Deuber, Société d'art public (Geneva, Switzerland), Editor : Conrad André Beerli, Publisher : Société d'art public, p. 143, p. 230, 1985
 L'industrie chocolatière suisse avant, pendant et après la guerre, Volume 31 of Collection de l'École des hautes études commerciales de l'Université de Lausanne, Armand Mulhaupt, Impr. Vaudoise, p. 36, 1932
 L'Industrie Chocolatière Suisse, Etude Economique sur le Cacao et le Chocolat, Edition la Concorde, Edouard Schiess, 1913
 CANTON DE GENEVE - RECENSEMENT ARCHITECTURAL DU CANTON DE GENEVE; Direction du patrimoine et des sites - Service des monuments et des sites, Fiche RPI-108,Bénédict Frommel et Tanari Architectes

External links 
  Chocolat Croisier eMuseum listing

Swiss chocolate companies